Oregon Coast Community College (OCCC) is a public community college in Newport, Oregon. OCCC serves students in Lincoln County and has approximately 2,000 students and a faculty of 45 people. Of the 17 community colleges in Oregon, only Klamath Community College is younger, and only Tillamook Bay Community College has fewer students.

History 
OCCC held its first classes in 1987, meeting in whatever spare space the staff could find. "You could be teaching in a church basement, fire station, real estate office," former college president Patrick O'Connor recalled. The following year, OCCC found a permanent home in a building formerly known as "Jake's High Tide Bar".

In 2004, local voters approved a $23.5 million bond levy, which was used to build three buildings between Lincoln City and Waldport. 

In 2020, just weeks before the onset of the Pandemic, OCCC became officially independent accredited for the first time in its 30-plus year history. Today, graduates of Oregon Coast Community College receive diplomas bearing the institution's name and seal. 

The College offers a variety of transfer degrees and specialty programs ranging from nursing and allied health to the innovative "Teach at the Beach" teacher education program, created in concert with Western Oregon University and the Lincoln County School District. The College also offers robust business certificate and degree programs, and Early Childhood Education certificate program, expanded computer science and chemistry coursework, and much more.

Facilities 
OCCC consists of three learning centers in the communities of Newport, Waldport, and Lincoln City. The Central Campus in Newport consists of the main campus structure (77,677 sq. ft.) and the Aquarium Science Building (9,274 sq. ft.), which are located on 20 acres of newly developed timber land in the South Beach area. The Aquarium Science facility is equipped with an animal holding laboratory, a teaching lab, a food prep area, and a water quality/animal health lab. Each facility was engineered and constructed to Leadership in Energy and Environmental Design (LEED) Silver standards by meeting energy efficiency and indoor air quality criteria. The North Center (25,025 sq. ft.), in Lincoln City, is situated near Taft High School, which supports a considerable enrollment of Taft students in OCCC courses. The South Center (4,200 sq. ft.), in Waldport, is adjacent to Waldport High School and Crestview School. This facility supports the local community by housing programs in Allied Health.

Aquarium Science Program
Oregon Coast Community College offers a degree program in aquarium science, and is the only college in the United States to do so. There are two programs, one to obtain an associate's degree and the other a one-year certification for those with a bachelor's degree or higher in life sciences. Because of the limited number of places available (22 at present), applicants must apply early and are interviewed by several aquarists and biologists. Classes offered range from Biology of Captive Fish and Aquatic Animal Health Management to a scuba diving course. Those studying for either their associate degree or their one-year certification end with an internship at a public aquarium, zoo, fish hatchery, or marine laboratory.

See also 
 List of Oregon community colleges

Notes

External links
 Official website

Community colleges in Oregon
Education in Lincoln County, Oregon
Educational institutions established in 1987
Buildings and structures in Lincoln County, Oregon
1987 establishments in Oregon